Amir Zukić (born 8 August 1966) is a Bosnian politician who was the general secretary of the Party of Democratic Action from 2005 to 2018. He was a member of both the Federal House of Peoples and House of Representatives as a representative of the Party of Democratic Action.

In May 2020, Zukić was subject to a travel ban by the United States for his involvement in "corrupt practices". A trial is ongoing since 2017 for illegal employment for people in public companies in exchange for money.

Personal life and education
Zukić was born in Rogatica, SFR Yugoslavia, present-day Bosnia and Herzegovina. He holds a master's degree from the Faculty of Political Science at the University of Sarajevo. 

He is married to Elma Zukić and together they have two sons. They live in Sarajevo.

References

External links
Official website 

1966 births
Living people
People from Rogatica
Party of Democratic Action politicians